Remco Balk (born 2 March 2001) is a Dutch professional footballer who plays as a forward for Eredivisie club Cambuur, on loan from Utrecht.

Club career
Balk made his professional debut with Groningen in a 3–1 Eredivisie loss to FC Twente on 25 September 2020. 

On 20 January 2021, it was announced that he make a transfer to FC Utrecht. He signed a contract until 2025.

Balk was sent on a one-season loan to Cambuur on 2 June 2022.

References

External links

BDFutbol Profile
 Career stats & Profile - Voetbal International

 
2001 births
Living people
People from Zuidhorn
Dutch footballers
Association football defenders
Eredivisie players
Eerste Divisie players
FC Groningen players
Jong FC Utrecht players
FC Utrecht players
SC Cambuur players
Footballers from Groningen (province)